= Isanpur mota =

Isanpur Mota village is located in Gandhinagar taluka of Gandhinagar district in Gujarat, India. It is situated 15km away from Gandhinagar, which is both district and sub-district headquarter of Isanpur Mota village. As per 2009 stats, Isanpur Mota village is also a gram panchayat.

The total geographical area of village is 1285.14 hectares. Isanpur Mota has a total population of 3,985 people, out of which male population is 2,039 while female population is 1,946. Literacy rate of isanpur mota village is 71.12% out of which 79.60% males and 62.23% females are literate. There are about 806 houses in isanpur mota village. Pincode of isanpur mota village locality is 382355.

This village has access to basic health care as it consists of a hospital named Shree M.B. Patel Sarvajanik Hospital. It has two schools.

The area around the village consists of a lake which is a home to many birds and fish.
